Jonathan Stuart (born 29 December 1975 in Burnley, England) is an English born former Scotland 'A' international rugby union player who played for Glasgow Warriors, then Glasgow Caledonians, at the  Centre position.

Stuart originally played rugby for Paris University in season 1997-98 before signing for Leicester Tigers in the 1998-99 season. He had 8 starts for the Tigers and a further 8 appearances from the substitutes bench.

He signed for Glasgow Warriors in 1999 playing for them in the Heineken Cup, the Scottish-Welsh League and the Celtic League.

Stuart said of the move: "My main ambition is to play rugby for Scotland and I believe this move will provide me with the best opportunity to achieve that. Scotland's performances in the Five Nations championship inspired me and, having spoken with the Glasgow Caledonians coaching staff, they have assured me that they intend to play the same 15-man game."

Stuart had rejected approaches from England Students and the England Under 21 side to play for Scotland. He believed his grandfather was from Glasgow. He played for Scotland Under 21s in 1997 and was then picked for a Scotland 'A' international against Ireland 'A' in the 1999-2000 season, however he was later found to be ineligible in 2000.

His Scottish international career stalled when it was discovered that it was his great-grandfather and not his grandfather that was born in Glasgow. Stuart then had to wait out his residency period before making his dream return to Scotland colours.

He earned a legitimate Scotland 'A' cap to finally confirm his Scottish nationality - against Romania on 5 November 2002. Scotland won the match 21-18, with Stuart coming off the bench.

He was signed by the Border Reivers in 2002. When not involved with the professional provincial side he played for the amateur side Selkirk RFC. He played 4 matches in the Challenge Cup for the Reivers in the first season - and 6 matches in the Heineken Cup the next season as well as matches in the Celtic League.

In 2004, Stuart went back to France and signed for Lyon OU; in 2005 he moved to La Rochelle and played there till 2008.

When Stuart finished his professional playing career he worked in marketing for Force XV. He then became a rugby agent at Top Marque Sports and is now a director of the company.

External links 
Warriors signing

References 

1975 births
Living people
Scottish rugby union players
Rugby union centres
Glasgow Warriors players
Border Reivers players
Selkirk RFC players
Lyon OU players
Stade Rochelais players
Leicester Tigers players
Scotland 'A' international rugby union players